The International Cheer Union (ICU) is the worldwide sports governing body of cheerleading (also known as "Cheer"). It was founded in 2004, and is recognized by SportAccord / Global Association of International Sports Federations (GAISF), and is a member of the Association of IOC Recognised International Sports Federations (ARISF). Its membership includes 116 national cheer federations on all continents - reaching over 5 million athletes globally.

In July 2021 at the 138th IOC Session in Tokyo, the International Olympic Committee (IOC) voted to grant full recognition to the International Cheer Union.

World Governing Body of Cheerleading 
On 6 December 2016, the International Cheer Union (ICU) was provisionally recognized by the International Olympic Committee (IOC) as the world governing body for Cheerleading / the Sport of Cheer. Prior to 2016, on 31 May 2013 - following a positive vote by the SportAccord General Assembly in Saint Petersburg, the International Cheer Union (ICU) became SportAccord’s 109th member, and SportAccord’s 93rd International Sports Federation to join the international sports family. In accordance with article 6.a) of the SportAccord statutes, the ICU is recognized as the world governing body of Cheerleading and the authority on all matters related to this sport.

On 29 August 2012, Federation Internationale de Gymnastique (FIG), ICU and SportAccord signed a trilateral agreement finalizing terms and conditions under which FIG supports the principle for the admission of the ICU into SportAccord. The ICU is a partner of FISU (Fédération Internationale du Sport Universitaire / International University Sports Federation), as well as Special Olympics International and is also a signatory and is fully compliant under the code set by the World Anti-Doping Agency (WADA).

Objectives 
The International Cheer Union is a non-profit international governing entity with the objectives to serve as an advocate for those dedicated to the advancement of Cheerleading, provide balanced input and governance based on the levels of development to all participating members and to train and further educate athletes, coaches and officials. The ICU is the world governing body of Cheerleading and the authority on all matters related it and engages in various activities compliant with the ICU statutes in the promotion of Cheerleading.

ICU's statutes are approved by the IOC, SportAccord/GAISF, adopted by the ICU General Assembly, and the ICU is a fully democratic International Sports Federation ("IF").

Governing Council 
The Governing Council represents the various geographic areas in which cheerleading exists. The council consists of twelve persons; eight continent/continental regional representatives, one At-Large Continental representative, one USA NGB representative, one At-Large Athlete representative, and one non-voting IASF representative.

Council members are recommended by their reflective entities as authorized by the ICU statues, and elected by the ICU General Assembly.

The ICU General Assembly comprises ICU's 116 National Cheer Federations and National Cheer Provisional Federations. Each National Cheer Federation receives one vote for all General Meeting election and voting processes. The ICU General Assembly last convened Tuesday 24 April 2018 in Orlando, Florida, USA, prior to the 2018 ICU World Cheerleading Championships.

The Officers of the ICU consist of a President, two Vice Presidents, a Secretary General, and such other officers recommended by the Governing Council and elected by the General Assembly.

The Executive Committee consists of the following members:
 President
 Immediate Past President
 Both Vice Presidents  
 Secretary General  
 Treasurer

Organization 
Membership in the ICU is available to all National Cheer Federations within accordance of the ICU statutes, and the ICU shall reasonably assist countries, National Cheer Federations, National Olympic Committees, continental and other regions to create opportunities for participation.

Open to all National Cheer Federations, only one National Cheer Federation shall be admitted representing each country. Each Member Federation which is in Good Standing, as defined by the ICU Statutes, will have one vote as a member of the General Assembly.

The ICU is one of the fastest growing International Sports Federations in the world. Founded in 2004, the ICU reached a milestone of 100 member national federations in 2011. Today the ICU currently encompasses 116 member national federations located in Africa, Americas, Asia, Europe and Oceania.

Education 
In over 100 countries, the ICU continues to administer educational and training programs for athletes, coaches and officials to better improve the ongoing growth and development of cheer programs.

The ICU provides coaches training and certifications on safety, rules, technical training and overall program development strategies. The training includes course work, practical application training and required field work.

The officials and judges training implements a greater understanding of cheerleading, as well as to promoting fairness and quality in all contests for the betterment of the world's cheerleading athletes.

Championships 

The ICU administers championship cheerleading competitions around the world. These events include:
 Open Championships
 Regional Championships
 Continental Championships
 Junior World Championships
 World Cheerleading Championships
 Multi-Sport Games Championships

References

External links
Official website